The Last Man to Fly is The Tear Garden's second full release, released five years after the first. The album was the product of a single five hour long recording session. A single title "Romulus and Venus" was released and was well received by critics.

This time cEvin Key's bandmate D. Rudolph Goettel from Skinny Puppy became a permanent member of The Tear Garden. Also joining the band were The Silverman, Ryan Moore, and Martijn de Kleer from Edward Ka-Spel's own The Legendary Pink Dots, expanding the band from simply being an Edward and cEvin duo (with guests), as the previous release was.

Accompanying this release was their second EP, Sheila Liked the Rodeo.

Track listing
"Hyperform" – 5:12
"The Running Man" – 8:22
"Turn Me On, Dead Man" – 6:37
"Romulus and Venus" – 6:08
"The Great Lie" – 4:49
"Empathy with the Devil" – 7:52
"Circles in the Sand" – 3:27
"Love Notes & Carnations" – 5:19
"A Ship Named 'Despair'" – 3:41
"White Coats and Haloes" – 2:19
"Isis Veiled" – 3:22
"Last Post" – 8:58
"3-D Technicolour Scrambled Egg / Trip Down the Hell-Hole (with Canary)" – 7:09

Notes
Personnel:
cEvin Key
Edward Ka-Spel
Dwayne Rudolph Goettel
The Silverman
Ryan Moore
Martijn De Kleer
Dave "Rave" Ogilvie

Engineered by Ken Marshall at Mushroom in August 1991.

Edited by Anthony Valcic.

References

1992 albums
The Tear Garden albums
Nettwerk Records albums